The 16th annual Ale Kino! International Young Audience Film Festival was held from 27 April to 1 May 1998. A number of 47 movies took part.

The movies were presented in four cinemas in Poznań: Apollo, Rialto, Muza and Gwiazda.

The movies were judged by professional and children jury, as well as by International Centre of Films for Children and Young People (CIFEJ).

Awards

References

External links
 16th Ale Kino! Official Homepage
 16th Ale Kino! at the Internet Movie Database

Ale Kino! Festival
Ale Kino! Festival
Ale Kino! Festival, 16
Ale Kino! Festival